is a train station in Heguri, Ikoma District, Nara Prefecture, Japan.

Lines 
Kintetsu
Ikoma Line

Surrounding Area 
 Tatsuta River
 
 Roadside station Yamatoji Heguri

Adjacent stations 

Railway stations in Nara Prefecture
Railway stations in Japan opened in 1926